Gaston le Pût (15 December 1903 – 29 March 1972) was a French weightlifter. He finished fifth as a middleweight (−75 kg) at the 1928 Summer Olympics and 11th as a light-heavyweight (−82.5 kg) at the 1936 Summer Olympics.

References

External links
 

1903 births
1972 deaths
Olympic weightlifters of France
Weightlifters at the 1928 Summer Olympics
Weightlifters at the 1936 Summer Olympics
French male weightlifters